Coelomomyces is the only genus of fungi in the family Coelomomycetaceae. Species in the genus can be used as agents for the biological control of mosquitoes.

Characteristics
Coelomomyces are obligate parasites of mosquitoes and chironomids, meaning that they require their hosts to complete their lifecycle.  One species, Coelomomyces psorophorae, is even heteroecious; it requires two completely different hosts as part of its life cycle over the generations, larvae of both the mosquito Culiseta inornata as well as the copepod Cyclops venalis.  Due to their lethal nature and host specificity, they have been used by humans for biological control of mosquitoes and other insects.

The mycelium of Coelomomyces spreads among infected mosquito larva.  As the larvae disintegrate, the sporangia break free and are released to spread the fungus, sometimes among copepods who will die after nurturing the fungus for a time.  The exact path differs from species to species and case to case; sometimes the + and - gametes are present in the same host and can grow there, although they can also fuse outside the host and form a motile zygote that must find susceptible mosquito larvae to complete its life cycle.

Species
Coelomomyces contains the following species:

Coelomomyces stegomyiae Keilin 1921 (type)
Coelomomyces africanus A.J. Walker 1985 *Coelomomyces angolensis H. Ribeiro  1992
Coelomomyces anophelesicus A.V.V. Iyengar  1962   
Coelomomyces arcellaneus Couch & Lum 1985
Coelomomyces arsenjevii Koval & E.S. Kuprian. 1981
Coelomomyces ascariformis Van Thiel 1962
Coelomomyces azerbaijanicus E.S. Kuprian.  & Koval 1986 
Coelomomyces beirnei Weiser & McCauley 1972
Coelomomyces bisymmetricus Couch & H.R. Dodge  ex Couch 1962i hjにゅ7
Coelomomyces borealis　Couch & Service　1985
Coelomomyces cairnsensis Laird 1962 
Coelomomyces canadensis (Weiser & McCauley) Nolan 1978
Coelomomyces carolinianus Couch, Umphlett & H.A. Bond  1985
Coelomomyces celatus Couch & Hembree 1985
Coelomomyces chironomi Rasín 1929
Coelomomyces ciferrii Leão 1965Coelomomyces couchii Nolan & B.Taylor 1979Coelomomyces cribrosus Couch & H.R. Dodge ex Couch 1962Coelomomyces dentialatus Couch & Rajap. 1985Coelomomyces dodgei Couch 1962Coelomomyces dubitskii Couch & Bland 1985Coelomomyces elegans Couch & Rajap. 1985Coelomomyces fasciatus Couch & A.V.V. Iyengar 1985Coelomomyces finlayae Laird 1962Coelomomyces grassei Rioux & Pech 1962Coelomomyces iliensis Dubitskii, Dzerzh. & Daneb. 1973Coelomomyces indicus A.V.V. Iyengar 1962Coelomomyces iyengarii Couch 1985 Coelomomyces keilinii Couch & H.R. Dodge ex Couch 1962Coelomomyces lacunosus Couch & O.E. Sousa 1985Coelomomyces lairdii Maffi & Nolan 1977Coelomomyces lativittatus Couch & H.R. Dodge ex Couch 1962Coelomomyces macleayae Laird 1962Coelomomyces madagascaricus Couch & Grjebine 1985Coelomomyces milkoi Dudka & Koval 1973Coelomomyces musprattii Couch 1985Coelomomyces neotropicus Lichtw. & L.D. Gómez 1993Coelomomyces notonectae (Bogoyavl.) Keilin 1927Coelomomyces omorii Laird, Nolan & Mogi 1975Coelomomyces opifexi Pillai & J.M.B. Sm. 1968Coelomomyces orbicularis Couch & Muspratt 1985Coelomomyces orbiculostriatus 	Couch & Pras. 1985Coelomomyces pentangulatus Couch 1962Coelomomyces ponticulus Nolan & Mogi 1980Coelomomyces psorophorae Couch 1962Coelomomyces punctatus Couch & H.R. Dodge ex Couch 1962Coelomomyces quadrangulatus Couch 1962Coelomomyces raffaelei Coluzzi & Rioux 1962Coelomomyces reticulatus Couch & A.J. Walker 1985Coelomomyces rugosus Couch & Service 1985Coelomomyces sculptosporus Couch & H.R. Dodge ex Couch 1962Coelomomyces seriostriatus Couch & J.B. Davies 1985Coelomomyces solomonis Laird 1962Coelomomyces stegomyiae Keilin 1921 type specieCoelomomyces sulcatus Couch & A.V.V. Iyengar 1985Coelomomyces tasmaniensis  Laird 1962Coelomomyces thailandensis Couch, D. Gould & Hembree 1985Coelomomyces triangulatus Couch & W.W. Martin 1985Coelomomyces tuberculatus Bland & Rodhain 1985Coelomomyces tuzetiae Manier, Rioux, F. Coste & Maurand 1970Coelomomyces uranotaeniae Couch 1945Coelomomyces utahensis Romney, Couch & L.T. Nielsen 1985Coelomomyces walkeri'' Van Thiel 1962

References

External links 
 

 

Blastocladiomycota
Fungus genera